Gullybukta is a southern bay of Magdalenefjorden in Albert I Land at Spitsbergen, Svalbard. The glacier Gullybreen debouches into the bay.

References

Bays of Spitsbergen